In human anatomy, the inguinal triangle is a region of the abdominal wall. It is also known by the eponym Hesselbach's triangle, after Franz Kaspar Hesselbach.

Structure
It is defined by the following structures:
 Medial border: Lateral margin of the rectus sheath.
 Superolateral border: Inferior epigastric vessels.
 Inferior border: Inguinal ligament.

This can be remembered by the mnemonic RIP (Rectus sheath (medial), Inferior epigastric artery (lateral), Poupart's ligament (inguinal ligament, inferior).

Clinical significance
The inguinal triangle contains a depression referred to as the medial inguinal fossa, through which direct inguinal hernias protrude through the abdominal wall.

History 
The inguinal triangle is also known as Hesselbach's triangle, after Franz Kaspar Hesselbach.

See also 
Terms for anatomical location
Inguinal hernia surgery

References

Abdomen
Medical mnemonics